A copyholder is a device that holds the hand written or printed material being typed by a copy typist.  They were used in the past with typewriters and are now used with computers and word processors like Writer or Word.

Some copyholders stand independently whilst others are attached to CRT based computer monitors.  They can support entire booklets or a single page.  Elaborate varieties can even be adjusted by height or angle and some come with rulers and guides that appear over the front of the page.  

Office equipment